FEATI University (Far Eastern Air Transport Incorporated University) is a private non-sectarian co-educational higher education institution with a Catholic orientation established in 1946  in Santa Cruz, Manila, Philippines. FEATI was formerly known as the Far Eastern School of Aeronautics.

History
Salvador Araneta with his wife Victoria Lopez de Araneta founded the Far Eastern Air Transport Incorporated (FEATI), the first airline in the Philippines flying the Iloilo-Manila-Hong Kong route.

The Aranetas decided to close the airline but adopted its name as part of a school they established on March 6, 1946, and named it the FEATI Institute of Technology. The educational institution focused on the fields of engineering and technology. The school was granted university status by the Department of Education in 1959 with Victoria Lopez de Araneta as the first president of FEATI University.

The FEATI University currently occupies as a  campus.

Academics

The university's Graduate School offers postgraduate degrees that includes Master of Arts major in College Teaching, Master of Arts major in Educational Administration and Supervision and Master of Science in Management Engineering. The following are the colleges of FEATI University:

College of Architecture
School of Fine Arts
College of Arts, Sciences and Education
College of Business
College of Engineering
College of Maritime Education

Building 

Fernando Ocampo Sr.’s Paterno Building built in 1929 at the foot of MacArthur Bridge in Santa Cruz and was inspired from Art Deco and Missino Revival architectures . It had a symmetrical rectangular plan with a clean and simple character in design, having blocks of windows organized in a series of regular bays. Two passageways were emphasized by canopies and plain art deco treatment over the second-level windows and on the raised pediments.

Athletics
The FEATI University maintains an athletics program.

In the '07 Nike Summer League, the Seahawks Men's Basketball team succeeded in making it into the quarter finals but was defeated by more experienced sides De La Salle University- Manila  on June 4, 2007. In September 2009, FEATI co-founded the Interscholastic Athletic Association (ISAA) along with other member-schools Manila Adventist Medical Center and Colleges, FEU-East Asia College, Manila Doctors College, La Consolacion College Manila, Philippine Women’s University, Lyceum of the Philippines University and Southville International School and College.

Notable alumni

Brig. General Recaredo Albano (BSCE, BSAE, BSGE, MSME), former Chief of Engineers of the Armed Forces of the Philippines (AFP) from 1983 to 1986.
Rodolfo Biazon (BSME), former Philippine Senator
Ireneo Bughao (BSMarE, ABMath, MSM) made it to Ripley’s Believe It or Not as the man who can beat the computer in telling the day of any date in the past or future millennia.
Romulo Espaldon (BSAE), first rear admiral of the Philippine Navy and first governor of Tawi-Tawi Province. Former Philippine Ambassador (Kingdom of Saudi Arabia)
Dick Israel (BSME), Philippine Actor
Mariano Zuniega Velarde (BSGE) or better known as Bro. Mike (b. August 20, 1939) is the founder and Servant Leader of the Philippine-based Catholic Charismatic religious group El Shaddai Movement which has a following of an estimated three to seven million Filipinos.

References

External links

www.featiu.edu.ph
Feati University Bachelor of Arts in Mass Communication

Universities and colleges in Manila
Education in Santa Cruz, Manila
Educational institutions established in 1946
Aviation schools in the Philippines
1946 establishments in the Philippines